Al Unser Jr.'s Road to the Top is a racing video game released for the Super Nintendo Entertainment System.

Gameplay
In order to succeed in the racing world, the player has to progress from go-karts to snowmobiles, IROC racing cars, and eventually to Indy racing cars.

If the player does well, then the final challenge is to take on Al Unser Jr. in the final event at Vancouver. This race uses the Molson Indy Vancouver as a final test of the player's skills. The player can also practice every stage of the game except the final stage. Go-kart racing involves regional action in the United States of America while snowmobiles provide challenge for the game's simulated winter months. Competing in the stock cars of the IROC is considered to be gaining experience for the faster and lighter open wheel vehicles of the Indy league.

Game progress is saved using passwords.

Reception

In their review, GamePro described Al Unser Jr's Road to the Top as an excellent racing game for beginners due to its simple mechanics and controls and uncluttered graphics.

Allgame gave the game a rating of 2.5 out of 5 stars.

See also
Al Unser Jr.'s Turbo Racing

References

1994 video games
Champ Car video games
North America-exclusive video games
Radical Entertainment games
Super Nintendo Entertainment System games
Super Nintendo Entertainment System-only games
Video games set in Canada
Video games set in Vancouver
Video games developed in Canada
Multiplayer and single-player video games
The Software Toolworks games